After the Rain is the sixth studio album by Muddy Waters. It is the follow-up to the previous year's Electric Mud, and shares many of the same musicians. Unlike Electric Mud, After the Rain contained mostly Waters's own compositions; the songs, while still distorted, are less overtly psychedelic.

Releases 

On September 13, 2011, Get On Down Records digitally remastered and reissued the album on compact disc and vinyl. On November 22, 2011, After the Rain and Electric Mud were combined and reissued on a single disc by BGO Records.

Track listing

Personnel

Musicians 
Muddy Waters – vocals, lead guitar tracks 3, 5, 6 & 8
Phil Upchurch – guitar
Morris Jennings – drums
Otis Spann – piano
Louis Satterfield – bass
Pete Cosey – guitar
Charles Stepney – organ
Paul Oscher – harmonica

Additional personnel 
Stu Black – Engineer
T.T. Swan – Re-mix production 
Marshall Chess – Production
Charles Stepney – Production
Gene Barge – Production

References 

1969 albums
Chess Records albums
Cadet Records albums
Muddy Waters albums
Albums produced by Marshall Chess
Albums produced by Charles Stepney
Albums produced by Gene Barge